The Ghost Dance War was the military reaction of the United States government against the spread of the Ghost Dance movement on Lakota Sioux reservations in 1890 and 1891. The U.S. Army designation for this conflict was Pine Ridge Campaign. White settlers called it the Messiah War. Lakota Sioux reservations were occupied by the U.S. Army, causing fear, confusion, and resistance among the Lakota. It resulted in the Wounded Knee Massacre wherein the 7th Cavalry killed over 250 Lakota, primarily unarmed women, children, and elders, at Wounded Knee on December 29, 1890. The end of the Ghost Dance War is usually dated January 15, 1891, when Lakota Ghost-Dancing leader Kicking Bear decided to meet with US officials. However, the U.S. government continued to use the threat of violence to suppress the Ghost Dance at Lakota reservations Pine Ridge, Rosebud, Cheyenne River, and Standing Rock.

Ghost Dance
The Ghost Dance ceremony began as part of a Native American religious movement in 1889. It was initiated by the Paiute religious leader Wovoka, after a vision in which Wovoka said Wakan Tanka (Lakota orthography: Wakȟáŋ Tȟáŋka, usually translated as Great Spirit) spoke to him and told him directly that the ghost of Native American ancestors would come back to live in peace with the remaining Native Americans for the rest of eternity, and that by practicing the ghost dances would hasten the arrival of these events. It was also believed that shirts worn during these ritualistic dances would protect the wearer from bullets. The Sioux also believed that a series of devastating natural disasters would occur, which would wipe out all white people while Native Americans would be protected. This movement/religion quickly spread by Native Americans throughout the continent and most western reservations, including Lakota reservations in South Dakota. Sitting Bull allowed Kicking Bear to preach and teach the dance at Standing Rock. At the same time, the religion was also preached by Short Bull to the Brulé at Rosebud Reservation and embraced by Spotted Elk at Cheyenne River, and by Red Cloud at Pine Ridge Reservation. This started the push to bring US troops into the Dakotas.

War
In the winter of 1890, the Lakota had been beset by a series of violations of the Fort Laramie Treaty of 1851 by the US involving land divisions among tribes in South Dakota. Furthermore, railroads, such as the  Fremont, Elkhorn and Missouri Valley Railroad and the Deadwood Central Railroad (later purchased by Chicago, Burlington & Quincy) were being built near or through traditional Sioux lands. There was also a dispute around the Black Hills land, where gold was found in 1874, resulting in the Black Hills Gold Rush. In April 1890, General Thomas H. Ruger, commander of the Department of Dakota, ordered the U.S. 8th Cavalry to establish a camp along the Cheyenne River in order to observe the Miniconjou band led by Spotted Elk, living just outside the reservation in a small village they had built. Reports from the 8th Cavalry show that between April and August 1890, the relationship between the soldiers and the Lakota was cordial and that the band was "peaceably disposed and have committed no depredations on the settlers of Meade County". 

The Standing Rock reservation also became a key point in the Ghost Dance movement. John M. Carignan, a Standing Rock school teacher, had reported that by October 1890, the number of his students had dwindled from 60 to just 3, saying that parents were pulling their children out of school to participate in the Ghost Dance.

Lieutenant colonel Edwin Sumner of the 8th Cavalry was ordered to escort Spotted Elk and his band into Camp Cheyenne. Spotted Elk said he would surrender the next day, with which Sumner agreed. Spotted Elk instead led his band to the Pine Ridge Reservation. On December 28, Spotted Elk and his band were eventually apprehended by the 7th Cavalry while en route to Pine Ridge. Major Samuel Whitside had wanted to disarm the band immediately. However, his interpreter convinced him that this would lead to a shootout and advised him to instead take the band to make camp at nearby Wounded Knee and disarm them the next day instead. The next morning, the attempt to disarm Spotted Elk's band resulted in the Wounded Knee Massacre. One deaf Lakota did not give up his weapon, possibly due to the US troops not knowing how to communicate with the deaf Lakota. His gun was discharged when he was seized by U.S. soldiers, at which point other Lakota began shooting at the soldiers. One of the US commanders heard this and ordered his troops to open fire. The commanders called in reinforcements from the Hotchkiss cannons previously placed on the adjacent ridge. These cannons mowed down everyone in range. By the time the smoke had cleared, almost 300 dead Lakota (mostly women and children), 25 dead and 45 injured US troops lay on the ground, many believed due to friendly fire. Many Lakota who had escaped the conflict were hunted down and killed by the remaining US troops. As this was happening, a blizzard came in. It prevented the US troops or the other Lakota from the Pine Ridge Reservation from retrieving their dead. This resulted in frozen dead bodies strewn across Wounded Knee Creek for the next three days. There was a public uproar when word of the gunfire reached the eastern US. The US government re-established the treaty they had broken with the Lakota to avoid further public backlash.

Aftermath
Much to the dismay of many Native Americans, twenty US troops were awarded the Medal of Honor for their actions at Wounded Knee.  Some Native Americans have pushed to get these medals rescinded. 

In more recent years, there have been takeovers of the Wounded Knee Memorial by militant protesters, both to remind the nation of this incident and to protest government treatment of Native Americans. The American Indian Movement (AIM) occupied the Pine Ridge Reservation near Wounded Knee in protest against the federal government from February 27 through May 8, 1973. Several people died or went missing during this 71-day standoff between federal authorities and Native American activists. This protest also came to be known as Wounded Knee II.

See also

References

External links
 Bureau of American Ethnology report on the Ghost Dance Religion
 Editorials by L. Frank Baum

-
Ghost Dance movement
History of South Dakota
Native American genocide
Native American history of South Dakota
Sioux Wars